Emergency Vets is a reality television series that airs on the U.S. cable network Animal Planet. First aired in 1998, it depicts the working and outside lives of the veterinarians at Alameda East Veterinary Hospital in Denver, Colorado, USA, plus the animals that they treat. At its peak of popularity, Emergency Vets alternated with The Crocodile Hunter as Animal Planet's most popular show.

The show stopped first-run production because Alameda East was occupied with building and eventually moving into a new facility in Denver. In 2004, a new documentary called E-Vets: The Cutting Edge aired on Animal Planet, showing the changes in Alameda East Veterinary Hospital since the show's final episode. The documentary scored good ratings and has been rerun several times as part of the Whoa! Sunday umbrella anthology show on Animal Planet, as well as inspiring a follow-up episode first aired in 2005 that took viewers on a tour of the new Alameda East facility while showing cases of animals receiving cutting-edge treatment at the new hospital.  Another documentary, Emergency Vets 20 Most Unusual Cases, aired on Whoa! Sunday in 2006, featuring 20 cases from the series including follow-ups with the families and interviews with the doctors involved.

In 2007, Animal Planet announced that the real-life drama at Alameda East would return to prime-time airwaves under a new title, E-Vet Interns.  The new series features six new veterinary interns during their first year of residency practice at the new Alameda East hospital, as well as familiar faces Dr. Robert Taylor, Dr. Kevin Fitzgerald, Dr. Preston Stubbs, and Dr. Holly Knor.  In preparation for the new show's debut on January 22, 2007, Animal Planet aired a new E-Vets special, E-Vets: Things Pets Swallow, featuring memorable cases from the Emergency Vets years dealing with dramatic objects that animals have ingested.

Staff
Emergency Vets featured a mix of surgeons, general practitioners, specialists, veterinary technicians, and Alameda East's annual class of 4–6 interns per year.  Among the staff members featured regularly:

Surgeons
 Dr. Robert A. Taylor, founder of Alameda East, who specializes in orthopedic surgery
 Dr. Steve Petersen, surgeon and director of Alameda East's intern program who left the hospital and the show in 1999
 Dr. Mark Albrecht, surgeon who replaced Petersen in the 2000 season; departed the hospital before the start of the 2001 season
 Dr. Preston Stubbs, surgeon who replaced Albrecht after his departure in the 2001 season

General Practitioners
 Dr. Kevin Fitzgerald, general practitioner who specializes in treating exotic animals, especially reptiles
 Dr. Holly Knor, general practitioner specializing in animal pregnancies and associated issues
 Dr. Andrea Oncken, general practitioner who left the hospital and the show in 1998
 Dr. Jeff Steen, graduate of the Alameda East intern program who joined the staff as a general practitioner in 2000; specializes in dental issues
 Dr. Ted Owen, DVM, Western Carolina Regional Animal Hospital
 Dr. Fred Rosen, DVM, Western Carolina Regional Animal Hospital
 Dr. Michelle L. Foot, DVM, Western Carolina Regional Animal Hospital
 Dr. Brandon T. Hughes, DVM, Western Carolina Regional Animal Hospital
 Dr. Bill Gibson, DVM, Western Carolina Regional Animal Hospital

Specialists
 Caroline Adamson (now Adrian), head of Alameda East's physical therapy department
 Dr. Dan Steinheimer, chief of radiology; director of Alameda East's intern program after Petersen's departure
 Dr. David Panciera, internal medicine specialist who left the hospital and the show in 1998 to take a professorship at Virginia Tech in Blacksburg, Virginia
 Dr. Doug Santen, internal medicine specialist
 Dr. Lauren Prause, internal medicine specialist who replaced Panciera in 1998 and left the show in 2000
 Dr. Etta Wertz, chief of anesthesiology who left the show in 2000
 Dr. James Bailey, consulting veterinary anesthesiologist
 Dr. Ric Olsen, human dentist who serves as an associate dentist at Alameda East

Veterinary Technicians
 Rebecca Barwick, vet tech who adopts an owner-surrendered German Shepherd in the episode "Perfectly Imperfect"
 Dr. John Fiddler, vet tech who returned to Alameda East after graduating from medical school to become an intern veterinarian, leaving the show in 2000
 Ray Parham, Sr. vet tech specializing in radiology procedures
 Jackie Steinheimer (née Lenz), Sr. vet tech who later married Dan Steinheimer and now runs Alameda East's Associate Staff program
 Jean Wilbert, vet tech often featured giving chemotherapy to animals undergoing cancer treatments
 Laura Maez, vet tech during the ringworm episode, now works at another Denver Area ER clinic

Special Years Movie
 Dog
 Squirrel
 Ostrich
 Horse
 Rabbit
 Panda
 Mouse
 Camel
 Raccoon

The farm animals
 Pig
 Cow
 Sheep          
 Cat            
 Pony
 Rooster
 Duck

The Wild Animals
 Elephant       
 Frog
 Zebra          
 Hippo
 Lion           
 Penguin
 Tiger          
 Polar Bear
 Giraffe        
 Brown Bear
 Chimpanzee     
 Red Fox
 Owl            
 Coyote
 Wolf

Interns
 Dr. Rani Pheneger (now Reyter), graduate of the Alameda East intern program who left the hospital and the show in 1998
 Dr. Juli White, graduate of the Alameda East intern program who left the hospital and the show in 1998
 Dr. Karin Cannizzo, graduate of the Alameda East intern program who left the hospital and the show in 1998
 Dr. Dennis Crow, graduate of the Alameda East intern program who left the hospital and the show in 1998
 Dr. Craig Webb, graduate of the Alameda East intern program who stayed an extra six months after his internship on a special assignment before leaving the hospital and the show in 1999
 Dr. Milan Hess, graduate of the Alameda East intern program who left the hospital and the show in 1999
 Dr. Sandy Wang, graduate of the Alameda East intern program who left the hospital and the show in 1999
 Dr. Laura Peycke, graduate of the Alameda East intern program who left the hospital and the show in 1999
 Dr. Amy Estrada, graduate of the Alameda East intern program who left the hospital and the show in 1999
 Dr. Katie Miller, graduate of the Alameda East intern program who left the hospital and the show in 1999
 Dr. Corey Wall, graduate of the Alameda East intern program who left the hospital and the show in 2000
 Dr. Jason Wheeler, graduate of the Alameda East intern program who left the hospital and the show in 2000 to work alongside Dr. Steve Petersen at another Denver-area animal hospital. Then in 2012 moved to Virginia to open a veterinary referral practice.
 Dr. Carrie Stephaniak, graduate of the Alameda East intern program who left the hospital and the show in 2000

E-Vet Interns
E-Vet Interns is a reality television series about veterinary interns working at Alameda East Veterinary Hospital in Denver, Colorado. It is a spinoff of Emergency Vets. E-Vet Interns began airing on January 22, 2007, also on Animal Planet.

References

External links
 Baltimore City Paper: Why Emergency Vets is TV's best tear-jerker
 Alameda East Veterinary Hospital
 

1998 American television series debuts
Culture of Denver
1990s American reality television series
2000s American reality television series
2008 American television series endings
Animal Planet original programming
Veterinary reality television series
Television shows set in Colorado